Joseph Osborne was the author of The Horsebreeder's Handbook, journalist for "Bell's Life of London" under the pen name "Beacon". Osborne was born in County Meath, Ireland in 1810 and died in Brighton 1901.

He was born into the Osborne family of Dardistown Castle. Educated in Belfast, raised in Ireland he became involved in horse training and racing from an early age. Joseph moved to London in 1861 to continue his career as a journalist writing for "Bell's Life in London", a sporting and racing paper. By this time he was prominent in the horse racing world and considered an authority of the breeding of thoroughbreds.

Osborne involvement with the Curragh Racecourse resulted in a lodge at the Curragh being named after him.

His first book The Steeple Chase Calendar and Hurdle Race Epitome was published in three volumes for seasons 1848-1851.

He was the owner/trainer of Grand National winner Abd El Kader in 1850 and 1851.

References 

1810 births
1901 deaths
Irish racehorse trainers
People from County Meath
Irish journalists
Irish racehorse owners and breeders